Sarah Gavron (born 20 April 1970) is a British film director. She has directed four short films, and three feature films. Her first film was This Little Life (2003), later followed by Brick Lane (2007) and Village at the End of the World (2012). Her film, Suffragette (2015) is based in the London of 1912 and tells the story of the Suffragette movement based on realistic historical events. Her most recent film is Rocks which she directed in a creative collaboration with the team and young cast. Rocks premiered at the Toronto International Film Festival and opened in cinemas in 2020.

Sarah Gavron is also both a wife and a mother, and "got into filmmaking to make a difference."  She has dedicated her career to accurately telling the stories of women. In addition, the scarcity of women filmmakers in the UK is what inspires Gavron with her own filmmaking, and her responsibility as a female director.

Biography
Gavron was educated at Camden School for Girls. She graduated from the University of York with a BA in English in 1992 and an MA in film studies from Edinburgh College of Art when it was associated with Heriot-Watt University. Later she went to the National Film and Television School. Sarah Gavron was in a directing class that was taught by Stephen Frears. Frears is one of her influences in filmmaking and directing, as well as Mike Leigh and Terrence Davies. She also cites many female filmmakers as having inspired her. Before studying at the National Film School, Sarah worked for the BBC in documentaries for three years.

Gavron is married to cinematographer David Katznelson, and together, they have two children.

Career
Gavron began her film career making documentaries, a field that seemed "more accessible at that point," but kept returning to narrative filmmaking because of her desire to tell stories.

Her first film, This Little Life (2003), is classified as a television drama with the plot surrounding a couple and their premature born child; Brick Lane (2007) is her second most recognized feature film, that is an adaptation of Monica Ali's novel Brick Lane, which encapsulates the life of a Bangladeshi, female immigrant living in London, U.K; Village at the End of the World (2012) which is a documentary that Sarah Gavron directed in a peninsula in Greenland; Her next film Suffragette (2015) is based in London of 1912 and tells the story of the Suffragette movement, specifically, the early twentieth century campaign of women's suffrage that centers on the lives of three women that take on fictitious names in the film, however represent non-fictional historical figures.

In Brick Lane (2007) Gavron centers the female protagonist in "one of the most ethnically diverse neighborhoods in the United Kingdom."

Suffragette (2015) is "this first major feature film to focus on the fight for women's suffrage”. The film conveys important themes regarding legal and social positions of women, wives and mothers in 1912.   Gavron believes that the women's suffrage movement must be regarded as a "multi stranded, and complex story that is still unfolding." Gavron intended Suffragette to be telling of important moments in the past, but also relevant in present day.  The film Suffragette (2015) was acquired by Focus Features (originally Relativity) in March 2015. The film premiered at the 2015 Telluride Film Festival.

Her most recent film, Rocks, premiered at the 2019 Toronto International Film Festival in the Platform Prize program.

Filmography
 The Girl in the Lay-By (2000)
 Losing Touch (2000)
 This Little Life (2003) (TV)
 Brick Lane (2007)
 Village at the End of the World (2013)
 Suffragette (2015)
 Rocks (2019)

Awards and nominations
Sarah Gavron was nominated for the BAFTA Award and BIFA Award for best director in 2007 for her film Brick Lane. The film won a Silver Hitchcock and best screenplay at the Dinard Festival of British Cinema. She received the Tangerine Entertainment Juice Award from the Hamptons International Film Festival for directing the movie Suffragette, as well as the Mill Valley Film Festival's Audience Award (Mind the Gap), also for directing that film.

See also
 List of female film and television directors

References

External links

1970 births
Living people
Film directors from London
British Ashkenazi Jews
English Jews
English people of Russian-Jewish descent
English people of Lithuanian-Jewish descent
English people of German-Jewish descent
Alumni of the University of York
People educated at Camden School for Girls
Alumni of the Edinburgh College of Art
Alumni of the National Film and Television School
British women film directors
Sarah Gavron
Daughters of life peers
WFTV Award winners